Davaasambuugiin Delgernyam (born 8 April 1990) is a Mongolian basketball player for the Mongolian 3x3 national team. He also plays in Ulaanbaatar MMC team, which is currently ranked # 8 in the world.

Professional career 
Delgernyam Davaasambuu started his professional career in 2010.

Ulaanbaatar MMC Energy 
Delgernyam Davaasambuu has been a member of Ulaanbaatar MMC Energy team since 2017 and one of the four players who founded the team. He began playing in FIBA 3X3 events with the Nanjing Challenger 2017 in April 2017, when his team finished third.

National team career
Delgernyam Davaasambuu represented for the Mongolian national basketball team at the 2013 Summer Universiade in Kazan, Russia  He also played at the 2014 Asian Games for representing Mongolian national basketball team in Incheon, South Korea.

3x3 National team career
Delgernyam Davaasambuu represented Mongolia men's national 3x3 team in a number FIBA 3x3 World Cup and FIBA Asia 3x3 Cup competitions. He won FIBA Asia 3x3 Cup in 2017, defeating the New Zealand men's national 3x3 team in the final.

References

External links

 Даваасамбуу Дэлгэрням - Mongolian government team page (in Mongolian)

1990 births
Living people
Mongolian men's basketball players
Basketball players at the 2014 Asian Games